The 2018 AFL Grand Final was an Australian rules football game contested between the West Coast Eagles and the Collingwood Football Club at the Melbourne Cricket Ground on 29 September 2018. It was the 123rd annual grand final of the Australian Football League (formerly Victorian Football League), staged to determine the premiers for the 2018 AFL season. The match, attended by 100,022 spectators, was won by West Coast by a margin of five points, marking the club's fourth premiership and first since 2006. West Coast's Luke Shuey won the Norm Smith Medal as the player judged best on ground. 

It is regarded as one of the greatest grand finals as well as one of the greatest games in AFL history; finishing first in a public poll of the AFL's 50 greatest games of the last 50 years in 2020.

The presentation ceremony following the match was the most watched television program in Australia for the 2018 calendar year, marking the fifth year running the AFL grand final topped television viewership, with 2.62 million viewers in the five largest Australian metropolitan cities.

Background

The club hosted third-placed  in the second qualifying final at Perth Stadium and overcame the Magpies by sixteen points to advance to a preliminary final.

Collingwood had missed the finals for the past four years and finished the 2017 season in thirteenth position, so was not considered a credible premiership chance at the start of the year. Despite this, the club produced its best season since 2011, finishing third. Collingwood faced the West Coast Eagles in Perth in its qualifying final and had led at various stages of the match before being overrun in the last quarter to lose by sixteen points. They rebounded to defeat Greater Western Sydney in the second semi-final by ten points, then had an upset win against reigning premiers  by 39 points in the preliminary final to advance to the grand final.

Media coverage

Radio coverage

Entertainment
As pre-match entertainment, the Black Eyed Peas performed a number of their hit singles, including "Where Is the Love?", "Let's Get It Started", "I Gotta Feeling" and their new single "Big Love". Filipina singer Jessica Reynoso filled in on vocals for former band member Fergie. Their set was followed by singer Jimmy Barnes, who started his performance with a rendition of "Flame Trees". Mike Brady performed "Up There Cazaly", his own traditional grand final song, while the national anthem was sung by Mahalia Barnes, Jimmy Barnes' daughter.

Match summary

First quarter
Collingwood dominated most of the opening quarter. West Coast spearhead Josh Kennedy had the first score of the game—a behind—before the Magpies scored the first five goals of the game. The first goal came from Travis Varcoe at the five-minute mark, followed by two in quick succession from young forward Jaidyn Stephenson, one from Jordan De Goey at the 16-minute mark, and another from Will Hoskin-Elliott after 22 minutes, ballooning the margin to 29 points. West Coast scored two late goals in the final couple of minutes of the quarter to reduce the margin to 17 points at quarter time: the first, after 27 minutes, was scored from a ricochet off Willie Rioli's shin on the goal-line and needed a video review to uphold the on-field decision; and the latter was scored by Kennedy from a set shot in the 29th minute.

Second quarter
The second quarter was a low-scoring affair, with only two behinds scored during the first twenty minutes of the quarter: one from West Coast's Mark Hutchings at the four-minute mark, and a rushed behind to Collingwood almost eighteen minutes into the term. De Goey broke the drought with his second goal of the afternoon, restoring Collingwood's lead to a relatively comfortable 23 points. But, as in the opening quarter, the Eagles scored two late goals: one from Hutchings at the 22-minute mark, and the other from Luke Shuey at the 26-minute mark, to reduce Collingwood's lead to only twelve points at half time.

Third quarter
West Coast and Collingwood traded goals in the third quarter. A very early goal to Kennedy inside the first minute of the quarter reduced the margin to six points, before tall forward Mason Cox kicked a goal in the fifth minute to restore Collingwood's two-goal lead. Jamie Cripps kicked a goal for West Coast in the eighth minute, and then Taylor Adams kicked one for Collingwood only a minute later, again restoring the Magpies' lead to two goals. Jack Darling scored his first goal of the match nine minutes later to bring the margin back to a goal.

In the 21st minute, a pivotal moment in the match occurred: Adams attempted to clear the ball from Collingwood's backline with a dangerous miskick which went towards Stephenson at centre half-back. Collingwood runner Alex Woodward, who was in the area delivering another message at the time (since runners were still allowed on the ground during general play at the time, as the rule limiting their access to the ground was introduced only in 2019), proceeded to accidentally impede Stephenson's access to the marking contest, allowing West Coast midfielder Elliot Yeo an uncontested intercept mark from which he kicked a  set shot and put West Coast ahead for the first time since the beginning of the game. There were no more goals in the quarter, with the Magpies initially edging ahead once again with three consecutive behinds in time-on, and Shuey levelling the scores at 8.7 (55) apiece with a late behind, which stood as the three-quarter time score.

Fourth quarter

The final term started off rapidly, with three goals scored within the first four minutes. Collingwood started the quarter with Brody Mihocek kicking a goal off the opening passage of play after just 34 seconds, and De Goey scoring his third goal for the match only a minute later to extend the margin to 12 points. Nathan Vardy kicked a goal at the three-minute mark to bring the deficit back to 6 points. Cox scored his second goal at the seven-minute mark to extend the margin back to 11 points, and Kennedy responded with his third goal 90 seconds later to bring the deficit back to 5 points.

The Eagles dominated the contest from this point forward, at one point leading the inside-50 count for the quarter 14–3; however, they repeatedly failed to convert, as four consecutive shots at goal in the middle portion of the quarter were behinds, narrowing the margin to one point. Collingwood's final score of the game, a behind, came from Hoskin-Elliott in the 22nd minute.

With less than three minutes remaining, West Coast put together a sequence of play starting from a spectacular mark by McGovern in defence, continuing with marks from Vardy and Liam Ryan before ending with a mark in the forward pocket by Dom Sheed – who was aided by a legal yet contentious shepherd in the marking contest by teammate Rioli on opponent Brayden Maynard. West Coast attacked again from the ensuing centre clearance, and Darling dropped an uncontested mark in the goal-square from which he would almost certainly have sealed victory for the Eagles. Collingwood managed to force a behind to extend the margin to five points inside the final minute, but they could not rebound the ensuing kick-in with Shuey taking an intercept mark from it. The siren sounded shortly after to give West Coast a 5-point win.

Norm Smith Medal

With 11 votes out of a maximum possible 12, Luke Shuey was awarded the Norm Smith Medal, after collecting 34 disposals, eight clearances and a crucial second-quarter goal. The award was presented by 2001 Norm Smith medallist Shaun Hart. Chaired by Gavin Wanganeen, the voters and their choices were as follows:

Teams
The teams were announced on 27 September 2018. Both sides went into the match unchanged from their preliminary final teams.

Umpires 
The umpiring panel, comprising three field umpires, four boundary umpires, two goal umpires and an emergency in each position is given below.

Numbers in brackets represent the number of grand finals umpired, including 2018.

Scoreboard

References

External links

2018 Australian Football League season
AFL season
2018 in Victoria (Australia)
2010s in Melbourne
AFL Grand Final 2018
VFL/AFL Grand Finals
West Coast Eagles
Collingwood Football Club